Stories of Jesus is an Australian television series which aired from 1957 to 1958. It was shown on ABC in Melbourne and Sydney, the only two cities in Australia which had television at the time. As the title suggests, it was a religious series. It aired in a 10-minute time-slot. It is not known how many episodes were produced. Remarkably, despite the mass wiping of ABC archival material in the 1970s, the National Film and Sound Archive holds four episodes, though one of these prints is missing the soundtrack.

References

External links

1957 Australian television series debuts
1958 Australian television series endings
Australian Broadcasting Corporation original programming
Black-and-white Australian television shows
English-language television shows
Television series about Christianity